Rylee Ann Foster (born 13 August 1998) is a Canadian soccer player who plays as a goalkeeper for FA Women's Super League club Liverpool FC. She has represented Canada at the under-17 and under-20 levels. In 2021, she was called up to the senior national team.

Early life
Raised in Cambridge, Ontario, Foster attended Stewart Avenue Public School, where she first excelled in sports from a young age, then Glenview Park Secondary School where she ran track and earned Junior Track Athlete of the Year honors.

Foster was a Liverpool supporter as a youth. Her grandparents were born in South Liverpool in Wavertree.

College career
Foster attended West Virginia University from 2016–2019 where she played for the West Virginia Mountaineers with fellow Canadian internationals Kadeisha Buchanan and Ashley Lawrence. She made 84 appearances for the Mountaineers and had 39 clean sheets (the second highest record in the school's history)

Club career

Liverpool F.C. 
Foster signed with Liverpool F.C. in January 2020 right before the COVID-19 pandemic. She made her debut in a 3-1 win over Manchester United in October 2020 during the Continental Cup. She made her FA Women's Super League debut in a 1-1 draw with Blackburn Rovers Ladies in March 2021. The same month, she signed a long-term contract with Liverpool F.C. in March 2021.

She was named Player of the Month for April after keeping two clean sheets, including saving Katie Wilkinson’s and Courtney Sweetman-Kirk’s penalties in a 1-0 away win at Sheffield United.

International career
Foster has represented Canada on the Canada U17 and Canada U20 teams. In 2021, she was called up to the senior national team.

In 2013, she earned Golden Glove honors at the 2013 CONCACAF Women's U-17 Championship after helping Canada finish in second place. She competed in two games at the 2014 FIFA U-17 Women's World Cup in Costa Rica where Canada reached the quarterfinals but were eliminated by Venezuela 3–2. In January 2021, she was called up to training camp for the senior national team ahead of the 2021 SheBelieves Cup in the United States. She was one of three goalkeepers called up for the tournament in March 2021.

Personal life 
Foster has a tattoo of Liverpool's anthem, "You'll Never Walk Alone," on the inside of her arm which she got after her grandmother passed away in 2013.

In October 2021, Foster was involved in a serious car crash suffering life-threatening injuries including breaking her neck. She is hoping to make a full recovery, after having to wear a neck halo device for many months.

Honours

Individual 
 CONCACAF Women's U-17 Championship Golden Glove: 2013
 CONCACAF Women's U-17 Championship Best XI: 2013

References

External links
 
 Profile at Liverpool F.C. Women
 
 

1998 births
Living people
Women's association football goalkeepers
Canada women's international soccer players
Canadian expatriate women's soccer players
Canadian women's soccer players
Expatriate women's footballers in England
Women's Super League players
Liverpool F.C. Women players
West Virginia Mountaineers women's soccer players
Sportspeople from Cambridge, Ontario
Canadian expatriate sportspeople in the United States
Expatriate women's soccer players in the United States
Canadian expatriate sportspeople in England
Soccer people from Ontario